Arbanaška River is a river located in the municipality of Prokuplje, Serbia. Its source is near the village Arbanaška, and it flows into the Toplica at Donja Toponica.

See also 
 Arbanaška Mountain, a mountain in Serbia
 Arbanaško Hill (Serbian: Arbanaško brdo, "Arbanaška Hill"), a hill in Serbia

References 

Rivers of Serbia